Charles Percy Blewitt (15 October 1877 – 15 December 1937) was an English cricketer who played a single first-class match, for Worcestershire against Kent in late June 1912. His one appearance at this level was not a success, as he made only 4 and 3.

He was born at Kates Hill, Worcestershire, and died in Danesford, Shropshire at the age of 60.

External links
 
 Statistical summary from CricketArchive

1877 births
1937 deaths
English cricketers
Worcestershire cricketers